Berosus quadridens is a species of hydrophilid beetles from Mexico, Guatemala, Nicaragua, Costa Rica and Cuba. It was previously considered a synonym of Berosus truncatipennis.

References

Hydrophilinae
Beetles described in 1863